Barik Kola (also Romanized as Bārīk Kolā and Bārīk Kalā) is a village in Feyziyeh Rural District, in the Central District of Babol County, Mazandaran Province, Iran. At the 2006 census, its population was 969, in 238 families.

References 

Populated places in Babol County